Henri Clermont (15 December 1901 – 25 September 1969) was a French racewalker. He competed in the 10 km walk at the 1924 Summer Olympics.

References

External links
 

1901 births
1969 deaths
French male racewalkers
Olympic athletes of France
Athletes (track and field) at the 1924 Summer Olympics
Place of birth missing